The 13th edition of the Strade Bianche was held on 9 March 2019. Starting and finishing in Siena, Italy, it was the fifth event of the 2019 UCI World Tour. It was won by Julian Alaphilippe, followed by Jakob Fuglsang. Wout van Aert was third.

Route

Result

References

External links
 

Strade Bianche
Strade Bianche
Strade Bianche
Strade Bianche